David Phelps (born 10 April 1977) is a Welsh sport shooter, who won Gold in the 50 meter rifle prone individual competition and Bronze in the corresponding pairs event for Wales at the 2006 Commonwealth Games. He went on to win individual Gold in the event at the 2018 Commonwealth Games.

History
Phelps comes from Cardiff in Wales. In August 2014, he married England Commonwealth rifle shooter Sheree Cox.

Career
In 2000 and 2001, Phelps won back-to-back British Prone Championships at the NSRA National Meeting.

Phelps was selected for his first Commonwealth Games in 2002 where he qualified for the final in the Men's 50M Prone Rifle, finishing 6th. He finished 11th in the Men's Prone Rifle Pairs with team-mate Robin Hilborne. Four years later he earned selection for the 2006 Commonwealth Games, by which time he was representing Great Britain at World Cup level. On 22 March 2006, Phelps claimed Gold in the men's  singles prone rifle event, with a score of 698.3. He followed this with a Bronze in the pairs prone rifle event with fellow countryman Gruffudd Morgan.

Phelps was selected again for the Commonwealth Games in 2010, in the singles and paired prone rifle (paired this time with Jamie Dummer), but failed to qualify for the final. In 2014 Phelps saw his fourth selection for Wales to the 2014 Commonwealth Games in Glasgow where he finished twelfth in the Prone Rifle Singles.

In January 2018 Phelps' fifth Commonwealth Selection was announced ahead of the Gold Coast Commonwealth Games. He went on to win Gold in the Men's Prone Rifle.

References

External Links
 
 

British male sport shooters
Welsh male sport shooters
ISSF rifle shooters
Living people
Commonwealth Games bronze medallists for Wales
Commonwealth Games gold medallists for Wales
Sportspeople from Cardiff
1977 births
Commonwealth Games medallists in shooting
Shooters at the 2018 Commonwealth Games
Shooters at the 2014 Commonwealth Games
Shooters at the 2010 Commonwealth Games
Shooters at the 2006 Commonwealth Games
Shooters at the 2002 Commonwealth Games
Medallists at the 2006 Commonwealth Games
Medallists at the 2018 Commonwealth Games